Paula Green may refer to:

Paula Green (1927-2015), American advertising executive
Paula Green (poet) (born 1955), New Zealand poet and children's author